HMS Lagan (K259) was a  of the Royal Navy (RN). Lagan was built to the RN's specifications as a Group II River-class frigate. She served in the North Atlantic during World War II.

As a River-class frigate, Lagan was one of 151 frigates launched between 1941 and 1944 for use as anti-submarine convoy escorts, named after rivers in the United Kingdom. The ships were designed by naval engineer William Reed, of Smith's Dock Company of South Bank-on-Tees, to have the endurance and anti-submarine capabilities of the  sloops, while being quick and cheap to build in civil dockyards using the machinery (e.g. reciprocating steam engines instead of turbines) and construction techniques pioneered in the building of the s. Its purpose was to improve on the convoy escort classes in service with the Royal Navy at the time, including the Flower class.

After commissioning in December 1942, Lagan served in convoy escort missions and participated in anti-submarine warfare exercises off Lough Foyle. The next day, Lagan and  sunk .

At 04:57 on 20 September 1943, a GNAT torpedo struck the stern of Lagan, causing critical damage to the ship and 29 dead. She was towed by the tugboat  to Mersey, arriving on 24 September, where Lagan was declared a constructive total loss. The wreck was sold for scrap in Troon on 21 May 1946.

References

External links 
 
 

1942 ships
River-class frigates of the Royal Navy
World War II frigates of the United Kingdom
Ships built on the River Tees